Paquequer River may refer to:

 Paquequer River (Sumidouro), a river in Brazil
 Paquequer River (Teresópolis), a river in Brazil